Everywhere but Home is a live DVD by the Foo Fighters, released November 25, 2003. It contains five concerts taken from their One by One tour.

Track listing

Toronto (Live At Arrow Hall, Toronto, Canada; 7th July 2003)
 "All My Life"
 "My Hero"
 "Breakout"
 "Have It All"
 "Generator"
 "Learn to Fly"
 "For All the Cows"
 "Stacked Actors"
 "Low"
 "Hey, Johnny Park!"
 "Monkey Wrench"
 "Times Like These" (Acoustic version)
 "Aurora"
 "Tired of You"
 "Everlong"

Live At Black Cat Washington, D.C., 1st May 2003
 "Doll" (Acoustic)
 "See You" (Acoustic)
 "For All the Cows" (Acoustic)
 "Everlong" (Acoustic)

Slane Castle (Live At Slane Castle, 23rd August 2003)
 "All My Life"
 "Everlong"

Reykjavík (Live At Laugardalshöll, Reykjavik, Iceland audio only; 26th August 2003)
 "All My Life"
 "The One"
 "Times Like These"
 "My Hero"
 "Learn to Fly"
 "Have It All"
 "For All the Cows"
 "Breakout"
 "Generator"
 "Stacked Actors"
 "Low"
 "Hey, Johnny Park!"
 "Monkey Wrench"
 "Aurora"
 "Weenie Beenie"
 "Tired of You"
 "Everlong"

Dublin (Hidden concert; The Ambassador, Dublin, 12 July 2002)
 "All My Life"
 "Breakout"
 "The One"
 "My Hero"
 "Aurora"
 "Low"
 "Everlong"

Hidden Song 
1. "My Hero" (Acoustic)

Bonus content

Hidden recording of the Dublin concert
Accessed by following these steps:
 Go to the main menu
 Select "Slane Castle"
 Press 3, wait for the red arrow to reappear
 Press 8, wait for the red arrow to reappear
 Repeat the previous steps for 2, 5, 4 and 6.

My Hero (acoustic)
Follow these steps:
 Go to the main menu
 Play the Washington, D.C./Black Cat concert
 Approximately 4:22 into the title, the text "D.C." will appear in the lower right corner
 Press enter on the controller while the text is visible
 A new menu appears with an option to play "FUNNY SHIT"

Personnel

Band members
 Dave Grohl – lead vocals, rhythm guitar
 Chris Shiflett – lead guitar, backing vocals
 Nate Mendel – bass
 Taylor Hawkins – drums

Foo Fighters video albums
Live video albums
2003 live albums
2003 video albums
RCA Records live albums
RCA Records video albums
Foo Fighters live albums